Varvarovka is a rural locality (a selo) in Varvarovsky Selsoviet of Oktyabrsky District, Amur Oblast, Russia. The population was 2529 as of 2018. There are 11 streets.

Geography 
The village is located on the left bank of the Ivanovka River, 51 km west of Yekaterinoslavka (the district's administrative centre) by road. Peschanoozyorka is the nearest rural locality. Services located in Varvarovka include Administratsiya Munitsipal'nogo Obrazovaniya Varvarovskiy Sel'sovet Oktyabr'skogo Rayona Amurskoy Oblasti  and Sberbank Rossii.

References 

Rural localities in Oktyabrsky District, Amur Oblast